Eaglette is an extinct town in Stoddard County, in the U.S. state of Missouri. The GNIS classifies it as a populated place.

A post office called Eaglette was established in 1904, and remained in operation until 1909. The community was named for eagles' nests near the original town site.

References

Ghost towns in Missouri
Former populated places in Stoddard County, Missouri
1904 establishments in Missouri